The National Society of The  Colonial Dames of America is an American organization composed of women who are descended from an ancestor "who came to reside in an American Colony before 1776, and whose services were rendered during the Colonial Period." The organization has 44 corporate societies and over 15,000 members. The national headquarters is Dumbarton House in Georgetown, Washington, D.C. The executive director since September 2021 is Carol Cadou.

History 
The organization was founded in 1891, shortly after the founding of a similar society, the Colonial Dames of America (CDA).  The main difference between the two is that the CDA was created to have a centrally organized structure under the control of the parent Society in New York City.

The NSCDA was intended as a federation of State Societies in which each unit had a degree of autonomy.  Another society formed around the same time was the Daughters of the American Revolution. Organized following the United States Centennial of 1876 and a Centennial in New York in 1889 (celebrating the Constitution), they built on renewed interest in America's past to work for preservation of historic collections and buildings, and education related to United States history. The NSCDA has been a leader in the field of historic preservation, restoration and the interpretation of historic sites since its New York Society first undertook the preservation of the Van Cortlandt House in 1897.

In November 2000, the NSCDA received the prestigious Trustee Emeritus Award for Excellence in the Stewardship of historic sites from the National Trust for Historic Preservation. Today 41 diverse properties are owned outright by the Corporate Societies of the NSCDA, 13 additional museum collections are owned by the Dames and 30 more properties receive substantial volunteer and financial support from Dames.

The organization includes 44 Corporate Societies with over 15,000 members. The Society headquarters is located at Dumbarton House (pictured below),  in Washington, D.C. In addition to its broad based activities in the museum field, the Society sponsors a number of scholarship programs and other historic preservation, patriotic service and educational projects to further the aims and objects of the Society. Historic house museums owned or operated by the NSCDA, include:
Andrew Low House, Savannah, Georgia
Burgwin-Wright House, Wilmington, North Carolina
Henry B. Clarke House, Chicago, Illinois
Dumbarton House, Washington, DC, the Society's national headquarters
Governor Stephen Hopkins House, Providence, Rhode Island
Gunston Hall, Mason Neck, Virginia
Haywood Hall, Raleigh, North Carolina
Old Indian Agency House, Portage, Wisconsin (www.agencyhouse.org)
Hoover-Minthorn House, Newberg, Oregon
Liberty Hall, Frankfort, Kentucky
McElroy Octagon House, San Francisco, California
Plum Grove Historic House, Iowa City, Iowa
Stenton, Philadelphia, Pennsylvania
Ximenez-Fatio House, St. Augustine, Florida
Mount Clare, Baltimore, Maryland
 McAllister House Museum, Colorado Springs, Colorado
Webb-Deane-Stevens Museum, Wethersfield, Connecticut
 Hotel de Paris Museum, Georgetown, Colorado
Joel Lane Museum House, Raleigh, North Carolina
Old First Presbyterian Church of Wilmington, Wilmington, Delaware
Tate House, Portland, Maine
 Moffat-Ladd House, Portsmouth, New Hampshire
 Whitehall Museum House, Middletown, Rhode Island
William Hickling Prescott House, Boston, Massachusetts
Wilton House Museum, Richmond, Virginia
A more complete listing, with links to many of the state societies and their historic properties, is included on the official website.

Notable members 
 Helen Gilman Noyes Brown (1867–1942), philanthropist
 Sarah Johnson Cocke (1865-1944), writer and civic leader
 Mary Hilliard Hinton (1869–1961), historian and anti-suffragist
 Anne Hazen McFarland (1868–1930), physician and medical journal editor
 Lilian Carpenter Streeter (1854–1935), social reformer
 Margaret Anderson Watts (1832–1905), social reformer

See also 
 Sons of the American Revolution (SAR)
 Children of the American Revolution (C.A.R.)
 The Mayflower Society
 Society of the Cincinnati

References

External links
 Official website
 Complete list of active hereditary societies
Papers, 1975-ca. 1978. Schlesinger Library, Radcliffe Institute, Harvard University.
 The American Revolution Institute

501(c)(3) organizations
Lineage societies
Clubs and societies in the United States
History of women in the United States
Nonpartisan organizations in the United States
Organizations established in 1891
Patriotic societies
 
Women's organizations based in the United States
Women's clubs in the United States
1891 establishments in the United States